Windsor (/ˈwɪnzə/) is a constituency in Berkshire represented in the House of Commons of the UK Parliament since 2005 by Adam Afriyie of the Conservative Party. It was re-created for the 1997 general election after it was abolished following the 1970 general election and replaced by the Windsor and Maidenhead constituency.

Constituency profile
The re-created constituency, from 1997, has continued a trend of large Conservative Party majorities.  In local elections the major opposition party has been the Liberal Democrats, who have had councillors particularly in the town of Windsor itself.  Affluent villages and small towns along the River Thames and around the Great Park have continued to contribute to large Conservative majorities, from Wraysbury to Ascot. The only ward with any substantial Labour support is in Colnbrook with Poyle, based in Slough.

Containing one of the least social welfare-dependent demographics and among the highest property prices, the seat has the third highest Conservative share of the vote in the country.  At the 2010 election, only two areas voted more strongly towards the Conservative Party: Richmond (Yorks) foremost followed by Beaconsfield in Buckinghamshire.

History
Windsor has had parliamentary representation for centuries, first sending a member in 1301, and continuously from 1424. It elected two members of parliament until 1868, when the constituency was reformed and its representation reduced to one MP. In 1974, the constituency was abolished and a similar one, Windsor and Maidenhead was created. However, in 1997 the constituency was recreated.

The early political history of the area was strongly influenced by the monarch and members of his or her family. Windsor Castle has been an important royal residence throughout the history of the constituency.

17th century
The pre-1832 franchise of the borough was held by inhabitants paying scot and lot (a local tax). On 2 May 1689 the House of Commons had decided that the electorate should be limited to the members of Windsor Corporation. This was disputed after the next election, in 1690, when the Mayor submitted two returns of different members. The House of Commons reversed the decision of the previous Parliament and confirmed the scot and lot franchise.

18th century
There were 278 electors in 1712. Namier and Brooke estimated that, in 1754–1790, there were about 300 electors.

During part of the 18th century the Duke of Cumberland (son of King George II) and the Beauclerk family (descended from King Charles II) had political interests in the borough.

King George III became personally involved in the hotly contested 1780 general election. George encouraged local landowner Peniston Portlock Powney to stand by paying him £2,500 from the King's personal account. The King wished to defeat Admiral Keppel (later Viscount Keppel), an incumbent. The monarch went so far as to canvass tradesmen who dealt with the royal household. After this royal interference in the election, Keppel lost by a narrow 16 votes. Namier and Brooke suggest the Windsor electorate had an independent streak and were difficult to manage.

19th century
In 1832 a new property based franchise replaced the scot and lot qualification. Under the new system, there were 507 registered electors in 1832. The borough representatives before the Reform Act 1832 included soldiers and people connected with the Royal Household, such as Sir Richard Hussey Vivian (MP 1826–1831) and Sir Herbert Taylor (MP 1820–1823). The constituency also returned politicians prominent in national politics, like the Duke of Wellington's elder brother the Earl of Mornington in the 1780s and 1790s or the future Prime Minister Edward Stanley (subsequently the Earl of Derby) in the early 1830s).

The Ramsbottom family filled one seat from 1806 until 1845. The borough had been loyal to the King's Pittite/Tory ministers in the late 18th and early 19th centuries, but became more favourable to the Whig interest after John Ramsbottom (MP 1810–1845) was elected.

By the 1860s the monarch had ceased to interfere in local affairs. The borough fell under the patronage of Colonel R. Richardson-Gardner. Richardson-Gardner was a local landowner, who caused some animosity when following the 1868 general election he evicted tenants who did not support him at the polls. This was the last Parliamentary election the Conservatives lost in Windsor.

Despite (or perhaps because of) his methods, Richardson-Gardner was elected to Parliament in 1874.

20th century
Successive Conservative MPs, before the First World War, had considerable influence in the constituency; especially when they subscribed generously to local institutions such as a hospital.

The county division created in 1918 combined the town of Windsor, with territory to its west, south and east which had formerly been in the Wokingham division. The incumbent MP for Wokingham up to 1918, Ernest Gardner, was the first representative of the expanded Windsor constituency. The Conservative Party retained the seat continuously, until 1974 when a Windsor constituency temporarily disappeared from the House of Commons.

Boundaries and boundary changes 
The constituency covers the town of Windsor and various portions of the surrounding area, in Berkshire.

Before 1868: The parliamentary borough of New Windsor was based upon the easternmost town in Berkshire in South East England, which grew up around Windsor Castle and the narrowly defined electorate could also vote for the county representatives. The north boundary of the constituency was on the River Thames, which was then the border between Buckinghamshire which had a seat of the same name and Berkshire, likewise the rest of the borough adjoined the Berkshire county constituency.

1868–1918: The boundaries of the parliamentary borough were extended by the Parliamentary Boundaries Act 1868 (31 & 32 Vict., c. 46) to include the villages of Clewer and Eton (the latter being in Buckinghamshire, north of the Thames). Between 1885 and 1918 the seat to the north of the Thames was the Wycombe division of Buckinghamshire and the other neighbouring constituency was the Wokingham division of Berkshire.

1918–1950: The parliamentary borough was abolished by the Representation of the People Act 1918 and replaced by a county division named Windsor. The local government areas (as they existed in 1918) which comprised the constituency were the Municipal Boroughs of New Windsor and Maidenhead, with the Rural Districts of Cookham, Easthampstead, Windsor and a part of Wokingham.

The new constituency comprised the bulk of the abolished Wokingham division, including Maidenhead and rural areas surrounding Windsor and Maidenhead, but excluding the Municipal Borough of Wokingham itself, and incorporating the abolished Borough, with the exception of Eton, which was added to the Wycombe division of Buckinghamshire.

1950–1974: The constituency was reduced in size by the Representation of the People Act 1948, comprising the Municipal Boroughs of New Windsor and Maidenhead, with the Rural Districts of Cookham and Windsor. Rural areas, including the Rural District of Easthampstead (which incorporated Bracknell) were transferred to the re-established County Constituency of Wokingham.

For the February 1974 general election, the constituency was abolished and renamed Windsor and Maidenhead, with no changes to its boundaries; this area plus Eton, which was transferred from Buckinghamshire, became the Royal Borough of Windsor and Maidenhead established under the Local Government Act 1972.

1997–2010: For the 1997 general election, in order to effect an increase in Berkshire's representation from 7 to 8 MPs in accordance with the Fourth Periodic Review of Westminster Constituencies, the Windsor and Maidenhead constituency was abolished and two separate constituencies of Maidenhead and Windsor were created. The majority of the electorate in the abolished constituency was included in Maidenhead, whilst Windsor was joined by Eton and Bray. It also included a ward of Slough Borough Council north of the Thames, which was transferred from the Borough Constituency of Slough, and was extended southwards to include a part of the abolished constituency of East Berkshire, including Ascot and Sunningdale.

The composition of the new constituency was:-

 The Borough of Bracknell Forest wards of Ascot, Cranbourne and St Mary's;
 The Borough of Slough Foxborough ward; and
 The Borough of Windsor and Maidenhead wards of Ascot & Sunninghill, Clewer & Dedworth East, Clewer & Dedworth West, Clewer East, Datchet, Horton & Wraysbury, Eton & Castle, Old Windsor and Sunningdale & Cheapside.

In 1998 there was a small re-alignment of county boundaries in the north east corner of Berkshire. This transferred to the Borough of Slough a small polling district from Surrey and another from Buckinghamshire to form Colnbrook and Poyle This new ward (since renamed Colnbrook with Poyle) was selected for the Windsor constituency, though involved two polling districts (the typically three-four subdivisions of wards).

2010–present: Further to the Fifth Periodic Review, the composition of the constituency is:-

 The Borough of Bracknell Forest wards of Ascot, Binfield with Warfield, Warfield Harvest Rise, and Winkfield and Cranbourne;
 The Borough of Slough Colnbrook with Poyle ward; and
 The Borough of Windsor and Maidenhead wards of Ascot and Cheapside, Castle Without, Clewer East, Clewer North, Clewer South, Datchet, Eton and Castle, Eton Wick, Horton and Wraysbury, Old Windsor, Park, Sunningdale, Sunninghill and South Ascot.

The constituency gained the northern part of the County Constituency of Bracknell, including Binfield.  Bray was transferred to Maidenhead and the Foxborough ward of the Borough of Slough returned to the Borough Constituency thereof.

Members of Parliament

Burgesses in the English Parliament, 1510–1707
As there were sometimes significant gaps between Parliaments held in this period, the dates of first assembly and dissolution are given. Where the name of the member has not yet been ascertained or (in the 16th century) is not recorded in a surviving document, the entry unknown is entered in the table.

The Roman numerals after some names are those used in The House of Commons 1509–1558 and The House of Commons 1558–1603 to distinguish a member from another politician of the same name.

MPs 1707–1868

MPs 1868–1974

MPs 1997–present

Elections

Elections in the 2010s

Elections in the 2000s

Elections in the 1990s

Elections in the 1970s

Elections in the 1960s

Elections in the 1950s

Elections in the 1940s

Elections in the 1930s 
General Election 1939/40
Another General Election was required to take place before the end of 1940. The political parties had been making preparations for an election to take place and by the Autumn of 1939, the following candidates had been selected; 
Conservative: Annesley Somerville
Labour:

Elections in the 1920s

Elections in the 1910s 

General Election 1914/15
 Another General Election was required to take place before the end of 1915. The political parties had been making preparations for an election to take place and by July 1914, the following candidates had been selected; 
Unionist: James Francis Mason
Liberal: James Alexander Browning

Elections in the 1900s

Elections in the 1890s 

 Caused by Richardson-Gardner's resignation.

Elections in the 1880s

Elections 1868–1880
The bloc vote electoral system was used in two seat elections and first past the post for single member by-elections and general elections from 1868. Each voter had up to as many votes as there were seats to be filled. Votes had to be cast by a spoken declaration, in public, at the hustings (until the secret ballot was introduced in 1872).

Elections 1690–1866

Note on percentage change calculations: Where there was only one candidate of a party in successive elections, for the same number of seats, change is calculated on the party percentage vote. Where there was more than one candidate, in one or both successive elections for the same number of seats, then change is calculated on the individual percentage vote.

Note on sources: The information for the election results given below is taken from Cruickshanks et al. 1690–1715, Sedgwick 1715–1754, Namier and Brooke 1754–1790, Stooks Smith 1790–1832 and from Craig thereafter. Where Stooks Smith gives additional information or differs from the other sources this is indicated in a note after the result. When a candidate is described as Non Partisan for an election this means that the sources used do not give a party label. This does not necessarily mean that the candidate did not regard himself as a member of a party or acted as such in Parliament. Craig's party labels have been varied to take account of the development of parties. Tory candidates are classified as Conservative from the 1835 United Kingdom general election. Whig and Radical candidates are classified separately until the formal establishment of the Liberal Party shortly after the 1859 United Kingdom general election.

Elections in the 1860s

 Caused by the previous election being declared void on petition after both Hoare and Labouchere were found guilty of bribery via their agents.

 

 Note (1865): Turnout is estimated, in the same way as for 1857. This election was declared void on petition.

 Caused by Hope's death.

Elections in the 1850s

 

 Note (1859): Turnout estimated as in 1857. A petition was presented after this election, but it was withdrawn before a formal decision was made upon it.

 

 Note (1857): As the number of electors who voted is unascertained, the minimum turnout is calculated by dividing the number of votes by two. To the extent that voters did not use both their votes the turnout figure will be an underestimate.

 Resignation of Wellesley

 

 Note (1852): A petition was presented against Wellesley only, but it was dismissed.

 Seat vacated on Reid's death

 Seat vacated on appointment of Hatchell as Attorney-General for Ireland

 Hay's resignation

Elections in the 1840s

 Note (1847): Stooks Smith has the registered electorate as 720.

 Caused by Neville's appointment as a Lord Commissioner of the Treasury

 Caused by Ramsbottom's death

 Note (1841): Later in his career Ralph Neville became known as Ralph Neville Grenville. A petition was presented challenging this election, but it was withdrawn before a decision was obtained.

Elections in the 1830s

 On petition de Beauvoir was unseated and Elley was seated on 6 April 1835, following a scrutiny.
 Note (1835): John Walter was a candidate, but he retired from the contest before the election.

Note (1832): Stooks Smith classified Ramsbottom as a Radical candidate from this election. However as Stenton, editing a book composed of Parliamentary biographies published by a contemporary after the Reform Act 1832, described Ramsbottom as being 'of Whig principles' he continues to be classified as a Whig in this article.

 Seat vacated on the appointment of Vivian as Commander of the Forces in Ireland

Elections in the 1820s

 Resignation of Taylor

 Note (1820): From this election Stooks Smith does not append junior to the name of John Ramsbottom.

Elections in the 1810s

 Death of Disbrowe

 Resignation of Ramsbottom

Elections in the 1800s

 Seat vacated when Williams was declared not duly elected

 Seat vacated on the appointment of Greville as a Groom of the Bedchamber

Elections in the 1790s

 Death of Isherwood

 Death of Powney

Elections in the 1780s

 Seat vacated on the appointment of Powney as Ranger of the Little Park.

 Death of Hussey-Montagu
 Note (1787): Lord John Russell was a candidate, but declined going to the poll.

 Note (1784): Richard Pennant was proposed, but declined going to the poll.

Elections in the 1770s

 Death of Tonson.
 Note (1772): Both Stooks Smith and Napier & Brooke refer to this MP as the Hon. John Montagu.

Elections in the 1760s

 Death of Beauclerk.

 Seat vacated on the appointment of Keppel to an office.

Elections in the 1750s

 Seat vacated on the appointment of Fox as Paymaster of the Forces.

 Seat vacated on the appointment of Fox as Secretary of State for the Southern Department.

Elections in the 1740s

 Seat vacated on the appointment of Fox as Secretary at War.

 Death of Beauclerk

 Seat vacated on the appointment of Fox to an office.

 Seat vacated on the appointment of Lord Sidney Beauclerk as Vice-Chamberlain of the Household.

Elections in the 1730s

 Seat vacated after the appointment of Lord Vere Beauclerk to an office.
 A double return was made. The House of Commons decided the correct result was Beauclerk 240 (60.00%) and Oldfield 160 (40.00%); a majority of 80 (20.00%). Beauclerk was declared duly elected on 27 March 1738.

 Succession of Malpas as the 3rd Earl of Cholmondeley

 Seat vacated on the appointment of Beauclerk as a Commissioner of the Navy.

Elections in the 1720s

 Succession of Burford as the 2nd Duke of St Albans.

Elections in the 1710s

 On petition, Wren and Gayer were unseated and Ashurst and Travers were seated on 14 April 1715.

 Masham created the 1st Lord Masham 1 January 1712

 Death of Paul

Elections in the 1700s

Elections in the 1690s

 Death of Adderley, in June 1693

 Note: There is a discrepancy between sources, as The House of Common 1690–1715 indicates that Wren was elected at this election; whereas Leigh Rayment indicates Sir Algernon May was re-elected; both with Baptist May.
 On petition, Wren and May were unseated and Porter and Adderley were seated on 17 May 1690.

See also
 List of parliamentary constituencies in Berkshire
 1942 Windsor by-election

Notes

References

Sources

 A Chronological Register of Both Houses of the British Parliament. Robert Beatson, 1807.
 Boundaries of Parliamentary Constituencies 1885–1972, compiled and edited by F.W.S. Craig (Parliamentary Reference Publications 1972)
 British Parliamentary Election Results 1832–1885, compiled and edited by F.W.S. Craig (Macmillan Press 1977)
 British Parliamentary Election Results 1885–1918, compiled and edited by F.W.S. Craig (Macmillan Press 1974)
 British Parliamentary Election Results 1918–1949, compiled and edited by F.W.S. Craig (Macmillan Press, revised edition 1977)
 British Parliamentary Election Results 1950–1973, compiled and edited by F.W.S. Craig (Parliamentary Research Services 1983).
 The House of Commons 1690–1715, by Eveline Cruickshanks, Stuart Handley and D.W. Hayton (Cambridge University Press 2002)
 The House of Commons 1715–1754, by Romney Sedgwick (HMSO 1970)
 The House of Commons 1754–1790, by Sir Lewis Namier and John Brooke (HMSO 1964)
 Social Geography of British Elections 1885–1910, by Henry Pelling (Macmillan 1967)
 The Parliaments of England by Henry Stooks Smith (1st edition published in three volumes 1844–50), second edition edited (in one volume) by F.W.S. Craig (Political Reference Publications 1973))
 Who's Who of British members of parliament: Volume I 1832–1885, edited by M. Stenton (The Harvester Press 1976)
 Who's Who of British members of parliament, Volume II 1886–1918, edited by M. Stenton and S. Lees (Harvester Press 1978)
 Who's Who of British members of parliament, Volume III 1919–1945, edited by M. Stenton and S. Lees (Harvester Press 1979)
 Who's Who of British members of parliament, Volume IV 1945–1979, edited by M. Stenton and S. Lees (Harvester Press 1981)

Parliamentary constituencies in Berkshire
Constituencies of the Parliament of the United Kingdom established in 1424
Constituencies of the Parliament of the United Kingdom disestablished in 1974
Constituencies of the Parliament of the United Kingdom established in 1997
Windsor, Berkshire